State Road 69 (SR 69) is a part of the Indiana State Road system that runs between Hovey Lake Fish and Wildlife Area and Griffin in US state of Indiana.  The  of SR 69 that lie within Indiana serve as a major conduit. Some of the highway is listed on the National Highway System. Various sections are urban two-lane highway, three-lane highway and rural two-lane highway.  The highway passes through residential, industrial and commercial properties.

SR 69 was first designated as a state road in 1931. SR 69 replaced the original State Road 20 designation of the highway which dated back to the formation of the Indiana state road system. SR 20 ran from Mount Vernon to New Harmony.  SR 69 also replaced the second designation of the highway, SR 65, from the Ohio River to New Harmony.

Despite its proximity to Interstate 69 being within neighboring Gibson and Vanderburgh Counties, the two routes have no relation to each other.

Route description
SR 69 begins at the Hovey Lake Fish and Wildlife Area in southwestern Posey County, near the confluence of the Ohio River and the Wabash River.  It proceeds roughly northeast as a rural two-lane on the banks of the Hovey Lake. The road turns due north, away from the lake, and towards Mount Vernon. The highway turn northwest passing around the southwest side of Mount Vernon, as a two-lane highway passing through farmland. The road turns east onto SR 62 and the two routes pass through downtown Mount Vernon.  On the east side of downtown the road becomes a four-lane divided highway. Soon after SR 69 leaves the divided highway heading north. The route heads away from SR 62, as a four-lane undivided highway.  The highway narrows to a two-lane highway and has a crossing with the Evansville Western Railroad track.

After the track, the roadway turns due west and has a sharp turn back due north, north of Mount Vernon. The highway heads north-northwest towards New Harmony as a rural two-lane highway, passing through mainly farmland with some woodlands. The route passes east of the Harmonie State Park and bypasses New Harmony to the southeast. SR 69 begins a concurrency with SR 66, heading northeast. Soon after the concurrency begin it ends with SR 66 heading due east and SR 69 still heading northeast. At an intersection with the western terminus of SR 68, SR 69 heads due north, before turning northwest. The highway makes a sharp curve heading northeast towards Griffin where it terminates at Interstate 64 (I–64).

The only segment of SR 69 that is included as a part of the National Highway System (NHS), is between SR 62 and I–64.  The NHS is a network of highways that are identified as being most important for the economy, mobility and defense of the nation.  The highway is maintained by the Indiana Department of Transportation (INDOT) like all other state road in the state. The department tracks the traffic volumes along all state highways as a part of its maintenance responsibilities using a metric called average annual daily traffic (AADT). This measurement is a calculation of the traffic level along a segment of roadway for any average day of the year. In 2010, INDOT figured that lowest traffic levels were the 260 vehicles and 20 commercial vehicles used the highway daily near the southern terminus. The peak traffic volumes were 16,500 vehicles and 2,240 commercial vehicles AADT along the section of SR 69 that is concurrent with SR 62.

History

By 1923 the route that SR 69 takes today was signed as SR 20 from Mount Vernon to New Harmony, the rest was county roads. In 1927, the whole segment of SR 20 was renumber SR 65. The number was changed one last time, in 1931, this time to SR 69. In that year the route was extended south to the Ohio River, with a ferry across the river to Kentucky.

Eventually it was connected to Interstate 64 at the Griffin exit and rerouted to bypass New Harmony. In the late 1990s, a number of relocations and widenings were made to the highway in order to increase its traffic capacity, including being rerouted onto the new William Keck Bypass around the eastern side of Mount Vernon. These improvements allow for coal trucks and other industrial vehicles to reach Mount Vernon and its Port of Indiana from Interstate 64 much easier than with the previous route.

Major intersections

See also
 Interstate 64 and Indiana 64 - another local pairing of both Interstate and State Road numbers.

References

External links

 Indiana Highway Ends - SR 69

069
Transportation in Posey County, Indiana